Graeme Evans (born 4 August 1942) is a former Zimbabwean cricket umpire. He stood in fifteen ODI games between 1997 and 2001.

See also
 List of One Day International cricket umpires

References

1942 births
Living people
Zimbabwean One Day International cricket umpires
Sportspeople from Hastings, New Zealand